Jason M. Lewis (born April 19, 1968) is an American state legislator elected in April 2014 to the Massachusetts Senate, representing the 5th Middlesex District. He is a Winchester resident and a member of the Democratic Party. From January 2009 to April 2014 he represented the 31st Middlesex district in the Massachusetts House of Representatives.

Born in South Africa, Lewis moved to the U.S. at the age of 12. He won an April 2014 special election to succeed Katherine Clark in the state Senate, first having won the March 2014 Democratic primary.

See also
 2019–2020 Massachusetts legislature
 2021–2022 Massachusetts legislature

References
							

Living people
Democratic Party Massachusetts state senators
Democratic Party members of the Massachusetts House of Representatives
People from Winchester, Massachusetts
South African emigrants to the United States
Harvard University alumni
1968 births
21st-century American politicians